Sükhbaatar or Sükhbaataryn may refer to:

People
 Damdin Sükhbaatar (1893–1923), Mongolian military leader and revolutionary hero
 Sükhbaataryn Yanjmaa (1893–1962), Mongolian politician and head of state, widow of Damdin Sükhbaatar
 Sükhbaataryn Batbold (born 1963), Mongolian politician and prime minister
 Sükhbaataryn Sürenjav (born 1951), Mongolian Olympic wrestler
 Bazaryn Sükhbaatar (born 1943), Mongolian wrestler
 Tümendembereliin Sükhbaatar (born 1964), Mongolian wrestler

Places in Mongolia
 Sükhbaatar Province, a province of Mongolia
 Sükhbaatar, Sükhbaatar, a district
 Sükhbaatar (district), a districts of the Mongolian capital of Ulaanbaatar
 Sükhbaatar (city), capital of Selenge province

See also
 Sükhbaatar inscriptions, 8th century Turkic inscriptions in Mongolia
 Sükhbaatar's Mausoleum, in Ulaanbaatar, Mongolia
 Sükhbaatar Square in Ulaanbaatar
 Mongolian name